Tragic Idol is the thirteenth studio album by British gothic metal band Paradise Lost. It was released on 23 April 2012 in Europe and 24 April 2012 in North America via Century Media Records.

In support of the album, Paradise Lost went on a UK concert tour with Insomnium.

Formats the album was released through are: Standard CD; Limited Edition 2-CD Box; a fan box, which includes a poster, album slipmat, gold marbled colored 7" & 12" Vinyl, A1 poster 135g, army cap and boxes selected at random will include handwritten lyrics by the band. This band has a box set titled Original Album Classics and they have a similar release titled Original Album Collection which has this album along with this band's other albums, In Requiem and Faith Divides Us - Death Unites Us. There are EMP Edition (200 copies) - gold vinyl, Amazon Edition (400 copies Germany / 200 copies France) - white vinyl, Nuclear Blast Edition (400 copies) - dark blue vinyl and Band Edition (250 copies, signed) - dark sand marbled vinyl

Guitarist Gregor Mackintosh commented: "The [new CD was] again produced by Jens Bogren and is influenced by classic doom metal and classic metal. I would say it is more melodic than the last record whilst retaining the heaviness. There are lots of guitar solos and melodies."

Also this is the first Paradise Lost studio album featuring Adrian Erlandsson on drums, who joined the band in 2009.

There is a track called "The Last Fallen Saviour" which was written for this album but it was initially made only available as a free flexi disc with Decibel magazine, but has since been included on Tragic Illusion 25, a rarities compilation released in 2013 to commemorate the band's 25th anniversary.

Track listing

Limited edition bonus CD

Limited edition Japanese edition CD

Credits

Paradise Lost
Nick Holmes – vocals and lyrics
Greg Mackintosh – lead guitar and music
Aaron Aedy – rhythm guitar
Steve Edmondson – bass
Adrian Erlandsson – drums

Production
Jens Bogren – production, mixing
Johan Örnborg – engineering

Imagery
Valnoir & Metastazis.com – album artwork
Paul Harries – photography
Paul Grand – background photography
Takehiko Maeda (前田岳彦) – liner notes

Charts

References

2012 albums
Paradise Lost (band) albums
Century Media Records albums
Albums produced by Jens Bogren